Scotorythra pachyspila is a moth of the family Geometridae. It was first described by Edward Meyrick in 1899. It is endemic to the Hawaiian islands of Kauai, Oahu, Maui, Lanai and Hawaii

The larvae feed on Metrosideros species.

External links

P
Endemic moths of Hawaii
Biota of Hawaii (island)
Biota of Kauai
Biota of Maui
Biota of Oahu